This is a list of states in the Holy Roman Empire beginning with the letter D:

References

D